Elinor "Ellie" Jackson (born Eleanor Junkin) (March 6, 1825 – October 22, 1854) was the first wife of Thomas J. "Stonewall" Jackson. She died in childbirth a little over a year after their marriage.

Youth
Elinor was the daughter of the prominent Presbyterian theologian George Junkin, who since 1848 was president of Washington College in Lexington, Virginia.

Marriage
In 1853, Elinor met Thomas Jackson, then a professor at the Virginia Military Institute, at her father's home in Lexington. Jackson was a frequent visitor to the Junkin home; the shy young professor and the old college president were united by common interests in theology and Presbyterian doctrine, and Elinor and Jackson both taught at the Presbyterian Sunday school in Lexington. Suddenly their friendship changed to love, and they became engaged. But Elinor's older sister Margaret was very jealous of their relationship, and the engagement was broken off on her behest. It resumed again, however, with Margaret's reluctant blessing, and George Junkin married Elinor and Jackson in August 1853.

Her sister Margaret was the second wife of VMI founder John Thomas Lewis Preston, who served with Thomas Jackson on the VMI faculty, and served on Jackson's staff during the American Civil War.

Death
The couple was extremely close, and through Elinor's influence Jackson's already strong faith deepened. In October 1854 Elinor was in labor, but the outcome was not happy. She gave birth to a stillborn baby and died herself shortly thereafter due to pregnancy complications. Jackson was devastated by grief but his faith supported him. The couple had been living with her father, and Jackson continued to live there for several years until he began courting Anna Morrison, the woman that would become his second wife.

Notes

References

Sources
 Arnold, Thomas Jackson (1916). Early Life and Letters of General Thomas J. Jackson: "Stonewall" Jackson. New York, NY: Fleming H. Revell. 
 Coulling, Mary Price (1993). Margaret Junkin Preston - A Biography. John F. Blair.
 Gwynne, S. C (2014). Rebel Yell. Scribner.
 Junkin, David X. (1871). The Reverend George Junkin, D.D.,LL.D. A Historical Biography. J.B. Lippincott & Co.
 Robertson, Jr., James I. (1997). Stonewall Jackson. McMillan Publishing.
 Robinson, Richard D. and Elisabeth (1975). Repassing at my side ...A Story of the Junkins. The Southern Printing Co.

1825 births
1854 deaths
Elinor
Deaths_in_childbirth